Mikhail Afanasyev (born 4 November 1986) is a Belarusian former professional footballer.

Club career
He was signed by FC Amkar Perm in February 2008. Afanasyev joined Torpedo-BelAZ Zhodino in January 2020.

International career
Afanasyev was the captain of the Belarus U21 team and participated in all three of the Belarusians' games at the 2009 UEFA European Under-21 Football Championship. He conceded a handball in the game against Italy U21, resulting in a penalty, which contributed to the 1–2 loss. Afanasyev holds the record for the most matches played and is also the highest goal scorer for the U-21 side. On 13 November 2009, he made his international debut for the Belarus B team, against Saudi Arabia B team in a friendly match.

Honours
MTZ-RIPO Minsk
Belarusian Cup winner: 2005

References

External links 

1986 births
Living people
Footballers from Minsk
Belarusian footballers
Association football midfielders
Belarusian expatriate footballers
Expatriate footballers in Russia
Expatriate footballers in Kazakhstan
Belarusian expatriate sportspeople in Russia
Belarusian expatriate sportspeople in Kazakhstan
Russian Premier League players
FC Smena Minsk players
FC BATE Borisov players
FC Partizan Minsk players
FC Amkar Perm players
FC Kuban Krasnodar players
FC Salyut Belgorod players
FC Dinamo Minsk players
FC Gomel players
FC Atyrau players
FC Shakhtyor Soligorsk players
FC Belshina Bobruisk players
FC Torpedo-BelAZ Zhodino players
FC Fakel Voronezh players
FC Isloch Minsk Raion players